Dead Blue is the third studio album by London-based dream pop band Still Corners. It was released 16 September 2016 by Wrecking Light.

Track listing
All tracks written by Tessa Murray and Greg Hughes:

References

External links
https://www.stillcorners.com/discography

2016 albums
Still Corners albums